HESTIM Engineering and Business School (abbreviated HESTIM) is a private higher education institution located in the city of Casablanca, Morocco. It was born in 2006 as a school of engineering offering degrees in industrial management. In 2008 it added civil engineering to its academic offer. In 2015-16 the original school was renamed HESTIM Engineering and a new school was created, HESTIM Management, offering degrees in business-related fields. Both independently accredited schools, HESTIM Engineering and HESTIM Management, constitute the HESTIM group.

HESTIM offers its own Moroccan-accredited undergraduate degrees in industrial engineering, logistics engineering, civil engineering, and management. It also offers French-accredited master's degrees in partnership with French universities and schools, such as UPHF (Université Polytechnique Hauts-de-France), ULCO (Université littoral côte d’opale), INSA Lyon (Institut National des sciences appliquées de Lyon), ESTIA (École supérieure des technologies industrielles avancées), IMT Lille Douai Ecole Mines de Douai.

References

Education in Casablanca
2006 establishments in Morocco
Educational institutions established in 2006
Business schools in Morocco
Universities and colleges in Morocco
21st-century architecture in Morocco